Klikařov is a village in the southeast of the Czech Republic. It is part of Neurazy municipality. In 2011 there were 72 inhabitants and 52 houses dedicated to living. The village was mentioned in the documents for the first time in 1551.

Gallery

References

Neighbourhoods in the Czech Republic
Populated places in Klatovy District